Timothy E. Belcourt (born July 4, 1962 in Penetanguishene, Ontario, Canada) is a Canadian curler,  and a .

Awards
Canadian Curling Hall of Fame: 1991
Curl Manitoba Hall of Fame: 1991
Springwater Sports Heritage Hall Of Fame: 2014

Teams

Personal life
Belcourt grew up in Elmvale, Ontario. He started curling in 1976 when he was 14 years old at Elmvale District High School. After high school, he attended Georgian College, and curled there too.

Belcourt is married and has three daughters. As of 2014, he worked for Point to Point Broadband in Barrie, Ontario.

References

External links
 
 Tim Belcourt – Curling Canada Stats Archive

Living people
1962 births
People from Penetanguishene
Canadian male curlers
Curlers from Simcoe County
World curling champions
Brier champions